The Van Wyck Brooks Historic District is a  historic district located in the city of Plainfield in Union County, New Jersey. Named after the author and literary critic Van Wyck Brooks, it was added to the National Register of Historic Places on December 10, 1985 for its significance in architecture. The district includes 109 contributing buildings. The Orville T. Waring House was added individually to the NRHP in 1979  and contributes to the district.

History and description
The district is in a residential area of Plainfield. Most of the houses date from 1875 to 1925 and display various architectural styles. The house at 935 Central Avenue was built  and features Second Empire architecture with a mansard roof. The house at 901 Madison Avenue was built  with Victorian architecture. The Waring House, another Victorian, was built in 1881 for oil industry pioneer Orville Taylor Waring. The house at 305 Stelle Avenue was built in 1909 with Tudor Revival architecture and features a half-timbered look.

See also
National Register of Historic Places listings in Union County, New Jersey

References

External links
 
 

Plainfield, New Jersey	
National Register of Historic Places in Union County, New Jersey
Historic districts on the National Register of Historic Places in New Jersey
Historic districts in Union County, New Jersey
New Jersey Register of Historic Places